Carly Mathis is an American attorney and beauty pageant titleholder from Leesburg, Georgia who was named Miss Georgia 2013.

Biography
She won the title of Miss Georgia on June 22, 2013, when she received her crown from outgoing titleholder Leighton Jordan.
Mathis had come second to Jordan the previous year.

Mathis’ platform is “Heart Health and Heart Safety” and she said she hoped to work with the American Heart Association and Children's Healthcare of Atlanta to raise awareness for heart health during her year as Miss Georgia. Her competition talent was a vocal rendition of Carrie Underwood's “I Know You Won't.” Mathis graduated with a degree in digital and broadcast journalism from the University of Georgia in May 2013.

Mathis planned to attend law school when her year as Miss Georgia was over. After graduating from the University of Georgia in 2013, Carly enrolled at the University of Georgia School of Law in 2015. She later became a "Double-Dawg" by graduating in 2018, passed the Georgia Bar Exam, and is now a practicing attorney in Atlanta. Mathis' mother, Wendy Gillespie, was Miss Albany 1985.

References

External links

 
 

Miss America 2014 delegates
Living people
People from Leesburg, Georgia
University of Georgia alumni
American beauty pageant winners
Miss America Preliminary Swimsuit winners
Year of birth missing (living people)